A dairy is a facility for the extraction and processing of animal milk.

Dairy may also refer to:
 Dairy farming, a class of agricultural enterprise for production of milk
 Dairy product, foodstuff produced from milk
 Dairy, Oregon, an unincorporated community in the United States
 Dairy (store), a type of convenience store in New Zealand 
 The Dairy, a building in Central Park, Manhattan, New York
 The Dairy, a building in Prospect Park, Brooklyn
 The Dairy, a UK farming periodical founded in 1889

See also
 Dairi (disambiguation)
 Dairy cattle, cattle cows bred for the ability to produce large quantities of milk
 Dairy Milk, a chocolate product of Cadbury brand